Susan W. Krebs (born December 4, 1959) is an American politician. She was a member of the Maryland House of Delegates from 2003 to 2023.

Background
Susan Krebs is the delegate representing Maryland District 5, which comprises southeast Carroll County, including Eldersburg, Marriottsville, and parts of Sykesville. In 2002, she defeated Democrat Kenneth Holniker with 62% of the vote.

In 2002, Krebs survived a close Republican primary election to her political challenger, Larry Helminiak, receiving 52% of the vote.  In the general election, however, she solidly defeated her Democratic challenger Anita Lombardi Riley, who only received 27% of the vote.

Education
Krebs attended Woodlawn High School in Baltimore County. She earned her B.A. from Towson State University in 1981.

Career
After college, Krebs was an accountant and financial consultant. She has been a member of the Freedom Area Citizens Council, various Parent Teacher's Associations (PTA'S). In 2002, she won election to the house of Delegates and was sworn in on January 8, 2003.

In February 2022, Krebs announced that she would not seek re-election to the House of Delegates in 2022.

Legislative notes
 voted for slots in 2005 (HB1361)
 voted against in-state tuition for illegal immigrants (HB6)

Election results

2010 Race for Maryland House of Delegates – District 9B
Voters to choose three:
{| class="wikitable"
|-
!Name
!Votes
!Percent
!Outcome
|-
|- 
|Susan Krebs, Rep.
|12,377
|  73.53%
|   Won
|-
|-
|Anita Lombardi Riley, Dem.
|4,403
|  26.16%
|   Lost
|-
|Other Write-Ins
|52
|  0.31% 
|   Lost
|-
|}

2006 Race for Maryland House of Delegates – District 9B
Voters to choose three:
{| class="wikitable"
|-
!Name
!Votes
!Percent
!Outcome
|-
|- 
|Susan Krebs, Rep.
|12,059
|  72.1%
|   Won
|-
|-
|Anita Lombardi Riley, Dem.
|4,621
|  27.6%
|   Lost
|-
|Other Write-Ins
|38
|  0.2%
|   Lost
|-
|}

2002 Race for Maryland House of Delegates – District 9B
Voters to choose three:
{| class="wikitable"
|-
!Name
!Votes
!Percent
!Outcome
|-
|- 
|Susan Krebs, Rep.
|10,093
|  62%
|   Won
|-
|-
|Kenneth Holniker, Dem.
|6,152
|  37.8%
|   Lost
|-
|Other Write-Ins
|27
|  0.1%
|   Lost
|-
|}

References and notes

External links
 http://susankrebs.com/
 http://www.msa.md.gov/msa/mdmanual/06hse/html/msa13983.html

1959 births
Living people
Politicians from Baltimore
Methodists from Maryland
Republican Party members of the Maryland House of Delegates
Towson University alumni
People from Carroll County, Maryland
Women state legislators in Maryland
21st-century American politicians
21st-century American women politicians